The Vaser is a right tributary of the river Vișeu in Romania. It flows into the Vișeu in Vișeu de Sus.

Tributaries
The following rivers are tributaries to the river Vaser:

Left: Măcârlău, Novicior, Novăț
Right: Puru, Lostun, Făina, Botiza, Valea Peștilor

References

External links
 , a site about Vaser Valley and other Maramures attractions, written in English and French. This includes details about the "Mocăniță" narrow-gauge railway that operates as a tourist attraction in the valley.
 , a short presentation of Vaser Valley, written in French.

Rivers of Romania
Rivers of Maramureș County
Braided rivers in Europe